Lee McConnell (born 9 October 1978) is a retired Scottish athlete, who competed in the 400 metres and 400 metres hurdles having started her career as a high jumper. She is a three-time Olympian who represented Great Britain in 2004, 2008 and 2012. With 12 medals from major championships, McConnell is the third most decorated Scottish track and field athlete of all-time (after Eilidh Doyle with 19 medals and Laura Muir with 13). She was voted Scottish Athlete of the Year in 2002, 2003 and 2007.

McConnell is a four-time World Championship bronze medallist in the 4 x 400 metres relay in 2005, 2007, 2009 and 2011, with the 2007 team setting the British record of 3:20.04. Her individual honours include winning a 2002 Commonwealth silver at 400 metres, 2002 European Championship bronze at 400 metres, and 2006 Commonwealth bronze at 400 metres hurdles.

Career 
Lee McConnell attended Holyrood R.C. Secondary School in Glasgow before graduating from Loughborough University in 2000 with a degree in Sports Science.

Originally a high jump (becoming Scottish champion in 1998, 1999 and 2000), before turning to the 400 m and then the 400 metres hurdles (winning Commonwealth Bronze in a PB time).

She was the Scottish 200 metres champion in 2002, and 2005. She also won the 400 m in 2001, and the 400 m at the AAA Championships in 2002.

Internationally, in 2002, McConnell won a bronze medal at the 2002 European championships in the 400 m, then added a Commonwealth Games silver in the 400 m. In 2003 at the European Cup, McConnell came second in both the 400 m and the 4 × 400 m relay. She went to finish fifth in the 400 m final at the 2003 World Championships.

Her personal best time over 400 m is 50.82 seconds.

After the 2007 season, McConnell decided to give up hurdling, as her transition from the flat had not been as successful as she had intended, and she returned to the 400 m flat. She broke the stadium record in the 400 m at the 2008 FBK Games, producing her fastest season opener.

At domestic level, McConnell later won the British 400 m title in 2008 and 2010, the British Inter-Counties 200 metres title in 2009, and two more Scottish 200 m titles (outdoor again in 2011 and indoor in 2013).

In 2018, McConnell was one of fifteen athletes inducted in to the Scottish Athletics Hall of Fame.

Relays 
In addition to winning medals in individual contests, she has been a fairly successful relay runner. McConnell was known for participating in the Great Britain 4 × 400 m relay team at major events.

McConnell won bronze medals in the 4 × 400 m relay at the 2005 and 2007 World Championships. She ran the first leg in a team with Donna Fraser, Nicola Sanders and Christine Ohuruogu in 2005 and ran the third leg in team with Ohuruogu, Marilyn Okoro and Sanders in 2007, which a set a national record.

In addition at the World Championships, she ran the first leg for the 4 × 400 m relay teams that finished fifth in 2001, sixth in 2003, and fourth in 2009, also running fourth leg for the team that finished fourth in 2011.

McConnell alongside Fraser, Catherine Murphy, and Ohuruogu finished fourth in the 4 × 400 m relay at the 2004 Olympics, but could inherit bronze medals from this event as American athlete Crystal Cox was later found guilty of doping offences. Cox and not the US team had her medal revoked but that could still change.

At the 2012 Olympics, she ran the second leg as Great Britain finished fifth in the 4 × 400 m relay.

She has also accumulated relay medals from the 4 × 400 m event from the Universiade Games (in 2001), the European Championships (in 2002 and 2010) and the European Indoor Championships (in 2005, 2007 and 2011).

For Scotland, McConnell ran in the 4 × 400 m relay at the Commonwealth Games in 2002 and 2010 (where a national record was set).

Retirement 
McConnell missed the 2013 season after becoming pregnant with her first child. She returned to training nine weeks after giving birth to her son with a view to competing at the 2014 Commonwealth Games in her hometown of Glasgow – however she announced her immediate retirement from athletics in April 2014.

International competitions

Personal life 
McConnell is a rugby union fan, and is supporter of the Glasgow Warriors and the Scotland national team.

References

External links 

 MTC profile

1978 births
Living people
British female sprinters
Scottish female sprinters
Scottish female hurdlers
British female hurdlers
British female high jumpers
Scottish female high jumpers
Olympic female sprinters
Olympic athletes of Great Britain
Athletes (track and field) at the 2004 Summer Olympics
Athletes (track and field) at the 2008 Summer Olympics
Athletes (track and field) at the 2012 Summer Olympics
Commonwealth Games silver medallists for Scotland
Commonwealth Games bronze medallists for Scotland
Commonwealth Games medallists in athletics
Athletes (track and field) at the 2002 Commonwealth Games
Athletes (track and field) at the 2006 Commonwealth Games
Athletes (track and field) at the 2010 Commonwealth Games
World Athletics Championships athletes for Great Britain
World Athletics Championships medalists
European Athletics Championships medalists
British Athletics Championships winners
AAA Championships winners
Universiade medalists in athletics (track and field)
Universiade silver medalists for Great Britain
Medalists at the 1999 Summer Universiade
Medalists at the 2001 Summer Universiade
Alumni of Loughborough University
People educated at Holyrood Secondary School
Sportspeople from Glasgow
Medallists at the 2002 Commonwealth Games
Medallists at the 2006 Commonwealth Games